Nicktoons is a British pay television channel launched on 22 July 2002 as Nicktoons TV. It is a cartoon-centric sister channel to Nickelodeon. The channel airs Nickelodeon's original animated series. As with all of the Nickelodeon networks domestically.

History
On 19 July 2002, Nick Jr. moved to channel 624 on Sky, to vacate its original 606 number for Nicktoons to launch on the following Monday. It showed a static screen with the Nicktoons logo and a notice displaying Nick Jr.'s new slot. Nicktoons launched on 22 July 2002 as "Nicktoons TV".

On 12 October 2004, Nicktoons TV was rebranded to Nicktoons. The rebrand featured the Pixel characters as the channel's first mascots, designed by Slomo Productions and directed by Filipe Alcada.

From 17 February 2007, there was another rebrand featuring 4 mascots; Rooftop (a moose), Beat (a mouse/rat), Colin (a brain) and Spoon (a humanlike creature), designed by Studio AKA. The new 'worldwide rebrand' logo for Nicktoons was introduced on 30 April 2010, with a new imaging campaign introduced on 11 February 2012. On 21 June 2013, some new idents made by Stu Gamble and StudioEDP titled "30 Seconds Of Fame" or just "30SOF" for short were introduced, featuring a singing monster-like person 'moving his body to the beat' to Space Funk by Jeffrey W Wade & Ruben Ayala (Minimal Dancer), a rapping grandad and a dog (G-Daddy), an Octopus who is a musician (Rocktopuss), a girl with a British accent reading a book of which being Little Red Riding Hood with her 'big gob' (Gobby Girl) and a singing blob who sings the song Bopalopalama Dipdip by David Bronze & Josh Phillips (Doo-Wop Blob). These idents came along with the 2014 rebrand as well, with another batch being named "30 Seconds Of Fame 2" or just "30SOF 2" for short in 2015. However, these idents were discontinued in 2021, though they are still currently in use on Nicktoons Global.  On 1 November 2014, there were new idents introduced with the eyes and faces of characters from shows.

In the autumn of 2022, the network took on several temporary brandings reflected in electronic program guides in concert with month-long marathons of several series, including Nick SpongeBob and Nick Horrid Henry.

On 31 October 2022, Sky sold its stake in Nickelodeon UK, including Nicktoons, to Paramount.

On 1 March 2023, Nicktoons rebranded as Nick SpongeBob again.

Sky channel moves
On 9 November 2020, Nicktoons moved from 606 to 605 on Sky (UK), Nick Jr. HD moved from 615 to 606 on Sky (UK).

On 9 November 2020, Nicktoons moved from 606 to 605 on Sky (Ireland), Nick Jr. moved from 615 to 606 on Sky (Ireland).

Availability

Cable
Virgin Media : Channel 717

Online
Now TV : Watch live

Satellite
Sky  and Sky : Channel 605

Terrestrial
BT : Channel 469

Sister channels

Nicktoonsters

On 18 August 2008, a new spin-off channel to Nicktoons was launched under the title of Nicktoonsters. The channel was exclusive to Sky. The channel broadcast older programming which was dropped from the main Nicktoons schedule prior to launch. It took up half the time of a channel space shared with Comedy Central Extra +1. The channel closed on 31 July 2009 and was replaced with a 1-hour timeshift of Nicktoons, Nicktoons Replay on 1 August 2009.

Nicktoons Replay
A +1 feed of Nicktoons known as Nicktoons Replay launched in place of Nicktoonsters on 1 August 2009. It was known as Nicktoons +1. The channel was discontinued 1 October 2012, with Comedy Central Extra +1 again in full control of the channel slot's airtime. Nicktoons Replay's old EPG position was used to launch a one-hour timeshift of Nick Jr., titled Nick Jr. +1.

Nicktoons Ireland
On 13 September 2012, it was announced that Sky would be launching an Irish feed of Nicktoons. It launched on 16 October 2012.

Programming

Programming blocks
In 2004, when Nicktoons TV extended its hours, the 19:00 – 22:00 slot was called Toonz2Nite (extended further to 23:00 in November 2005). This had a separate, distinct presentation from the main channel, and the programmes shown were generally aimed at older children.
The network began airing shows from NickSplat on 9 January 2017 until they stopped for unknown reasons around February 2017.

Logos

See also
 Nickelodeon (British and Irish TV channel)
 Nick Jr. (British and Irish TV channel)
 Nick Jr. Too
 Nicktoonsters
 Nick at Nite International versions

References

External links
 NickToons – Official site
 NickToons UK Official Site as of 2006 (Archive)
 

Nicktoons (TV network)
Children's television channels in the United Kingdom
English-language television stations in the United Kingdom
Television channels and stations established in 2002
Sky television channels
2002 establishments in the United Kingdom
Television channel articles with incorrect naming style
2012 establishments in Ireland